A unicorn is a legendary horse-like beast with a horn on its forehead.

Unicorn may also refer to:

Fictional entities
 Unicorn (Marvel Comics), a Marvel Comics supervillain
 Unicorn (Dungeons & Dragons), a fantasy role-playing game creature
 Unicorn (Tintin), a fictional sailing ship, the vessel in The Adventures of Tintin comics

Film and television
 The Unicorn (1955 film), a Swedish drama film
 The Unicorn (1978 film), a German film based on the novel by Martin Walser
 The Unicorn (2018 film), an American comedy film
 The Unicorn (TV series), a 2019 American sitcom on CBS

Literature
 The Unicorn (novel), 1963, by Iris Murdoch
 The Unicorn or Das Einhorn, a 1966 novel by Martin Walser

Military
 Opération Licorne, a French peacekeeping mission in Côte d'Ivoire
 Opération Licorne, a French nuclear test in French Polynesia; see Fangataufa#History
 Operation Unicorn (Scotland), a supporting plan for Operation London Bridge to be enacted in the event of a monarch dying in Scotland
 Unicorn APC, a land mine-protected wheeled armoured personnel carrier used by the Sri Lankan military
 HMS Unicorn, any of several British naval vessels
 HMS Unicorn (1634), a 56-gun ship
 HMS Unicorn (1748), a 28-gun sixth rate
 HMS Unicorn (1776), a French frigate captured by HMS Resource in 1781
 HMS Unicorn (1794), a 32-gun fifth rate
 HMS Unicorn (1824), a Leda-class frigate
 HMS Unicorn (I72), an aircraft maintenance carrier launched in 1941
 HMS Unicorn (S43), an Upholder-class submarine launched in 1992
 USS Unicorn, any of several United States submarines
 USS Unicorn (SS-429), a submarine cancelled in 1944, before construction began
 USS Unicorn (SS-436), a submarine laid down in 1945 and launched but never commissioned

Music

Groups 
 Unicorn (Japanese band), a rock band
 Unicorn (South Korean band), a girl group
 The Unicorns, a band from Montreal, Canada
 Unicorn (English band), English country rock band

Albums
 Unicorn (Chew Lips album) (2010)

 Unicorn (Tyrannosaurus Rex album) (1969)
 Unicorn (Ugress album) (2008)
 The Unicorn (album), a 1967 folk album by the Irish Rovers
 Unicorn, an album by Teruo Nakamura

Songs
 "The Unicorn" (song), by Shel Silverstein, made popular by the Irish Rovers
 "Unicorn" (song), by Noa Kirel, the Israeli song for the Eurovision Song Contest 2023
 "Unicorn", a song by Apoptygma Berzerk from Harmonizer
"Unicorn", a song by Basement Jaxx from Junto
 "Christmas Unicorn", a song by Sufjan Stevens from the 2012 album Silver & Gold

Sports
 Unicorns (cricket team), English, active from 2010 to 2018
 Hyundai Unicorns, a defunct South Korean baseball franchise
 Schwäbisch Hall Unicorns, a team playing American football in the German Football League
 Kristaps Porziņģis or the Unicorn (born 1995), Latvian basketball player
 The Unicorns, the mascot and athletic teams from the North Carolina School of Science and Mathematics

Other uses
 The Unicorn (black hole)
 Unicorn (coin) and half-unicorn, Scottish gold coins
 Unicorn (finance), a privately held startup company above a certain valuation
 Unicorn (spider), a genus of family Oonopidae
 Unicorn (web server)
 Unicorn fish (disambiguation)
 Honda Unicorn, a motorcycle sold in India
 Unicorn, a fairy chess piece in Raumschach
 Giant unicorn, a common name for Elasmotherium, an extinct European rhinoceros

See also

 The Gender Unicorn, an educational method used to describe the spectrums of gender and sexuality
 Unicorn Trend, the modern phenomenon of unicorns used as a pop-culture icon
 Eenhoorn (disambiguation), Dutch for unicorn
 Einhorn (surname), German for unicorn
 Gunicorn or Green Unicorn, a port on the Unicorn web server
 Invisible Pink Unicorn, a goddess popularized on a Usenet group about atheism, and intended to satirize theistic belief
 Licorne (disambiguation)
 List of unicorns
 Monoceros, the constellation of the Unicorn
 Narwhal or Unicorn whale, an Arctic species of whale with a tusk on its head
 Unicorn-Kanchana, a classical record label
 Unicron, a Transformers character